Chickasha Municipal Airport  is four miles northwest of Chickasha, in Grady County, Oklahoma. The National Plan of Integrated Airport Systems for 2011–2015 categorized it as a general aviation facility.

Facilities
The airport covers 720 acres (291 ha) at an elevation of 1,152 feet (351 m). Its single paved runway, 17/35, is 5,101 by 100 feet (1,555 x 30 m) concrete. It has two turf runways: 18/36 is 2,840 by 145 feet (866 x 44 m) and 2/20 is 2,525 by 100 feet (770 x 30 m).

In the year ending November 8, 2010 the airport had 4,000 general aviation aircraft operations, average 10 per day. 36 aircraft were then based at this airport: 80% single-engine, 17% multi-engine, and 3% helicopter.

History
Opened in October, 1941 as Wilson-Bonifils Field, the airport conducted contract basic flying training for the United States Army Air Forces. The contractor was the Wilson-Bonfils Flying Schools. Flying training was performed with Fairchild PT-19s as the primary trainer. Also had several PT-17 Stearmans and a few P-40 Warhawks assigned.  The wartime airport had up to six grass runways, with the runways being changed at times.

There may have been four auxiliaries associated with Chickasha - Aux #1, Aux #2, Aux #3 & Aux #4 but unconfirmed and location unknown.

Deactivated on 1 May 1945 with the drawdown of AAFTC's pilot training program. The airfield was turned over to civil control at the end of the war though the War Assets Administration (WAA).

Chickasha had scheduled airline flights on Central Airlines DC-3s for a year or two, ending in 1955.

See also

 Oklahoma World War II Army Airfields
 31st Flying Training Wing (World War II)

References 

 Manning, Thomas A. (2005), History of Air Education and Training Command, 1942–2002.  Office of History and Research, Headquarters, AETC, Randolph AFB, Texas 
 Shaw, Frederick J. (2004), Locating Air Force Base Sites, History’s Legacy, Air Force History and Museums Program, United States Air Force, Washington DC.

External links 
 Chickasha Municipal Airport at City of Chickasha website
 Chickasha Municipal (CHK) at Oklahoma Aeronautics Commission
 Aerial image as of February 1995 from USGS The National Map
 
 Chickasha Wings Inc  , Flight school started in 2003.

1941 establishments in Oklahoma
Airports in Oklahoma
Buildings and structures in Grady County, Oklahoma
Airports established in 1941
USAAF Central Flying Training Command
American Theater of World War II